The 1908 Svenska Mästerskapet was the thirteenth season of Svenska Mästerskapet, the football Cup to determine the Swedish champions. IFK Göteborg won the tournament by defeating IFK Uppsala in the final with a 4–3 score.

Qualifying round

First round

Quarter-finals

Semi-finals

Final

Notes

References 

Print

1908
Svenska
Mas